Cleyton da Silva Reis (born January 6, 1989 in Belém, Pará), known as Cleyton Amaral, is a Brazilian footballer who plays as midfielder for Castanhal. He already played for national competitions such as Copa do Brasil and Campeonato Brasileiro Série D.

Career statistics

References

External links

1989 births
Living people
Brazilian footballers
Association football midfielders
Campeonato Brasileiro Série D players
Nacional Futebol Clube players